The women's 4 × 400 metres relay event at the 1998 Commonwealth Games was held on 21 September on National Stadium, Bukit Jalil.

Results

References

Relay
1998
1998 in women's athletics